Denis-Will Poha (born 28 May 1997) is a French professional footballer who plays as midfielder for Swiss club Sion.

Club career

Early career
Born in Lannion in 1997, Poha started his football career with local team, Lannion FC, in October 2004. He played four seasons for Lannion and moved to Guingamp in July 2008, at the age of 11. After two years, Poha returned to hometown team, Lannion. After a season, he moved to Rennes.

Rennes
In 2015, Poha was called up for Stade Rennais first team. On 22 August, in a Ligue 1 match against Lyon, Poha was an unused substitute. On 14 December 2016, he made his senior team debut against in Coupe de la Ligue against Monaco at Stade Louis II, playing the game as a starter for full-time.

He was loaned to Nancy in January 2019 until the end of the season.

Vitória de Guimarães 
On August 2019, Poha was loaned to Primeira Liga club Vitória de Guimarães.

In August 2020, Vitória de Guimarães exercised the purchase option on Poha, and he signed a three-year contract with the club.

On 1 February 2021, Poha moved to Primeira Liga club Portimonense, on a loan deal until the end of the season. On 14 January 2022, he signed for Ligue 2 club Pau on loan.

Sion
On 14 June 2022, Poha signed a three-year contract with Sion in Switzerland.

International career
Poha won the 2016 UEFA European Under-19 Championship with France U19 national team, playing five games in the competition.

Career statistics

Honours
International
UEFA European Under-19 Championship: 2016

References

External links
 
 

1997 births
Living people
People from Lannion
Sportspeople from Côtes-d'Armor
Footballers from Brittany
French footballers
French sportspeople of Ivorian descent
Association football midfielders
France youth international footballers
Stade Rennais F.C. players
AS Nancy Lorraine players
US Orléans players
Vitória S.C. players
Portimonense S.C. players
Pau FC players
FC Sion players
Championnat National 3 players
Championnat National 2 players
Ligue 2 players
Ligue 1 players
Primeira Liga players
French expatriate footballers
French expatriate sportspeople in Portugal
Expatriate footballers in Portugal
French expatriate sportspeople in Switzerland
Expatriate footballers in Switzerland